Dmitry Vladimirovich Sopot, (born 1 May 1998) is a Russian retired pair skater. With former partner Ekaterina Borisova, he is the 2016 Youth Olympic champion, the 2016 World Junior bronze medalist, and 2015 Junior Grand Prix Final champion. He later competed with Anastasia Poluianova.

Career 
Sopot began learning to skate in 2001. He competed as a single skater before teaming up with Alexandra Evsiukova, in 2013. They skated together for one season.

Partnership with Borisova 
Sopot teamed up with Ekaterina Borisova in the summer of 2014. The two qualified for the 2015 Russian Junior Championships and finished in 8th place.

Borisova/Sopot made their international debut competing in the 2015–16 Junior Grand Prix (JGP) series. They took the bronze medal at their first assignment, the JGP in Latvia, before winning gold at the JGP in Poland. These results qualified them for the 2015–16 JGP Final in Barcelona. In Spain, they outscored the Czech Republic's Anna Dušková / Martin Bidař by 9.53 points for the gold medal.

In January 2016, Borisova/Sopot were awarded the bronze medal at the Russian Junior Championships, having finished third to Anastasia Mishina / Vladislav Mirzoev (gold) and Amina Atakhanova / Ilia Spiridonov (silver). In February, they represented Russia at the 2016 Winter Youth Olympics in Hamar, Norway. Ranked second in the short program and first in the free skate, they won the gold by a margin of 2.53 points over Dušková/Bidař. On March 17–21, competing at the 2016 World Junior Championships in Debrecen, Hungary, Borisova/Sopot placed fourth in the short and third in the free, taking the bronze medal overall behind Czech pair skaters Anna Dušková / Martin Bidař and teammates Anastasia Mishina / Vladislav Mirzoev who took the gold and silver medals respectively.

2017–2018 season: Partnership with Poluianova 
Sopot teamed up with Anastasia Poluianova in 2017. They made their international debut at the 2017–18 JGP event in Minsk, Belarus where they placed 2nd behind teammates Daria Pavliuchenko / Denis Khodykin. They placed 3rd at their second JGP assignment, in Gdańsk, Poland. Their results qualified them for the 2017–18 JGP Final in Nagoya, Japan, where they placed 6th.

In November 2017 Poluianova/Sopot made their international senior debut at the 2017 CS Tallinn Trophy where they won the bronze medal.

At the 2018 Russian Championships, they placed 10th on the senior level and 8th at the junior event.

2018–2019 season 

Poluianova/Sopot started their season by competing in the 2018 JGP series. At their first JGP event of the season they won the silver medal in Linz, Austria. They were ranked 3rd in the short program and 2nd in the free skate and they were part of a Russian sweep of the pairs' podium. Poluianova/Sopot were more than 14 points behind the gold medalists, Polina Kostiukovich / Dmitrii Ialin but they beat the bronze medalists, Alina Pepeleva / Roman Pleshkov, by more than 7 points.

At their 2nd JGP event of the season they placed 4th in Ostrava, Czech Republic. With these results they qualified for the 2018–19 Junior Grand Prix Final where they finished 5th.

According to Tamara Moskvina, head coach of the Tamara Moskvina skating school where Anastasia and Dmitri trained, they have split up. He went on a cruise ship to skate in shows there. She apparently is not looking for a partner to continue her competitive career but plans to join the cruise ship once she is old enough.

Programs

With Poluianova

With Borisova

Competitive highlights 
JGP: Junior Grand Prix

With Poluianova

With Borisova

Detailed results

With Poluianova

With Borisova

References

External links 

 

1998 births
Russian male pair skaters
World Junior Figure Skating Championships medalists
Living people
Sportspeople from Tver
Figure skaters at the 2016 Winter Youth Olympics
Youth Olympic gold medalists for Russia
Universiade silver medalists for Russia
Universiade medalists in figure skating
Competitors at the 2019 Winter Universiade